The FIBA Africa Women's Champions Cup is the highest continental tournament in African women's basketball. It is the counterpart of the men's basketball competition FIBA Africa Clubs Champions Cup. It is organized by the FIBA Africa and played by the champions of the leagues of the African countries.

History

Finals

Winners by club

Winners by country

MVP Award

See also
 FIBA Africa Championship for Women

References

 
International club basketball competitions
Basketball club competitions in Africa
Sports leagues established in 1985